The National Intercollegiate Rugby Association (NIRA) is a governing body of National Collegiate Athletic Association (NCAA) collegiate women's rugby programs in the United States founded in 2015. The organization is further organized into conferences (i.e. Rugby East, Ivy, etc.).

History 
The NIRA traces roots back to 2015 when eight NCAA member institutions formed the National Collegiate Varsity Women’s Rugby Association (NCVWRA) to organize collegiate competition and aid in the promotion of rugby at the varsity level in the NCAA after rugby was promoted to Emerging Sport status.

Inaugural members of the association included Army, Bowdoin, Brown, Central Washington, Harvard, Norwich, Quinnipiac, and West Chester. Membership in the organization was limited to NCAA institutions who sponsor women’s rugby at the varsity level. The foundation of the NCVWRA was in contrast to USA Rugby who sponsors collegiate competition for men’s and women’s rugby teams in a mixed format of club, quasi varsity, and full-varsity programs. In 2016 the association became known as the National Intercollegiate Rugby Association (NIRA).

Members

Championship finals

Division 1
 2019 – Army 7–18 Harvard 
 2018 – Dartmouth 19–14 Harvard
2017 – Quinnipiac 29–20 Dartmouth 
2016 – Quinnipiac 46–24 Central Washington 
2015 – Quinnipiac  24–19 Army

Division 2
 2019 – West Chester 15–14 Brown
 2018 – Mount St. Mary's 22–15 Sacred Heart
2017 – University of New England 57–14 Bowdoin
2016 – Bowdoin College 32–22  University of New England

Division 3
 2019 – Bowdoin College 27–5 University of New England

References

External links
 

College rugby union in the United States
College rugby union competitions in the United States
College sports governing bodies in the United States
Rugby union governing bodies in the United States